Tomoxia antipodes is a species of beetle in the genus Tomoxia of the family Mordellidae. It was described by Ray in 1930.

References

Beetles described in 1930
Tomoxia